The Indian locomotive class WAP-3 is a class of 25 kV AC electric locomotives that was designed by Research Design and Standards Organization (RDSO) and Chittaranjan Locomotive Works (CLW) for Indian Railways in 1987. The model name stands for Broad gauge (W), AC Current (A), Mixed traffic (M) engine, 3rd generation (3). They entered service in 1988. They are the faster variant of the previous WAP-1 class. All locomotives are now out of service or converted to WAP-1

History
The history of WAP-3 begins in the early 1980 with the WAP-1 class. The WAP-1 was the first attempt to create a dedicated High-speed electric passenger locomotive. They were first used on the Howrah Rajdhani Express. But Indian railways were not satisfied with the performance of the WAP-1 as they could haul around 19 coaches at a max speed of 120 km/h. So Indian Railways decided to procure a faster version of the WAP-1.

The WAP-3 was ordered from CLW to the design of RDSO. The Flexicoil cast steel bogies of the WAP-1 was replaced by Flexicoil Mark II versions. This increased max speed to 140 km/h. Five prototype locomotives of this type were made from existing WAP-1 units. The first prototype WAP-1 numbered '22005 jawahar'  was put into service in 1988. Initially these locomotives were classified as WAP-1 FM II with FM II standing for " Flexicoil Mark II " and were certified to run at 130 km/h between Jhansi and lalitpur section. Later Flexicoil Mark 4 bogies were provided for Subsequent WAP-3 which increased max speed to 160 km/h.

They were first used on the Taj Express and then various shatabdi express. The Bhopal shatabdi used to run with WAP-3 for some time. But as trains got longer the WAP-3 struggled to perform and required banking locomotives on moderately graded sections, and so did not meet their design goals these were reverted to WAP-1 class again.

The WAP-3 and WAP-1 provided the basis for the WAP-4 class.

Locomotive sheds 
The current list of  former WAP-3 class

See also

Rail transport in India#History
Indian Railways
Locomotives of India
Rail transport in India

References

External links 

Electric Locomotive Roster: The WAP Series!
[IRFCA] Indian Railways FAQ: Locomotives—Specific classes : AC Electric
[IRFCA] Indian Railways FAQ: Diesel and Electric Locomotive Specifications
11081 Colour Photographs, Indian Railways

25 kV AC locomotives
Co-Co locomotives
Electric locomotives of India
Railway locomotives introduced in 1988
5 ft 6 in gauge locomotives